Pamela Goldammer is a Swedish make-up artist. She was nominated for an Academy Award in the category Best Makeup and Hairstyling for the film Border.

Selected filmography 
 Border (2018; co-nominated with Göran Lundström)

References

External links 

Living people
Year of birth missing (living people)
Place of birth missing (living people)
Swedish make-up artists